Tinig (International title: Sonata of Heart / ) is a 2006 Philippine television drama series broadcast by GMA Network. The series is the fourth installment of Now and Forever. It premiered on January 9, 2006 replacing Agos. The series concluded on April 12, 2006 with a total of 68 episodes. It was replaced by Duyan in its timeslot.

Cast and characters

Lead cast
 Sheryl Cruz as Selena
 Yasmien Kurdi as Victoria / Ikay

Supporting cast
 Gary Estrada as Angelo
 Jay Aquitania as Joko
 Neil Ferreira as Macky
 Danica Sotto-Pingris as Tiffany
 Tin Arnaldo as Maribel
 Ailyn Luna as Corrine
 Jennifer Sevilla as Yvone
 Ian Veneracion as Juan Miguel
 Allan Paule as Renato
 Jan Marini as Remedios
 Dino Guevarra as Benjie
 Irma Adlawan as Noemi
 Richard Quan as Edgar

Guest cast
 Sandy Talag as young Ikay

Accolades

References

External links
 

2006 Philippine television series debuts
2006 Philippine television series endings
Filipino-language television shows
GMA Network drama series
Television shows set in the Philippines